The 1991 College Football All-America team is composed of college football players who were selected as All-Americans by various organizations and publications that chose College Football All-America Teams in 1991. It is an honor given annually to the best American college football players at their respective positions. 

The National Collegiate Athletic Association (NCAA) recognizes five selectors as "official" for the 1991 season. They are: (1) the American Football Coaches Association (AFCA); (2) the Associated Press (AP); (3) the Football Writers Association of America (FWAA); (4) the United Press International (UPI); and (5) the Walter Camp Football Foundation (WCFF).  Other notable selectors included Football News, Scripps Howard (SH), The Sporting News (TSN), and the Newspaper Enterprise Association in conjunction with World Almanac.

Nine players were unanimously selected by all five official selectors.  They are: running back Vaughn Dunbar of Indiana; wide receiver Desmond Howard of Michigan; center Jay Leeuwenburg of Colorado; tackle Greg Skrepenak of Michigan; defensive ends Santana Dotson of Baylor and Steve Emtman of Washington; linebacker Robert Jones of East Carolina; defensive back Terrell Buckley of Florida State; and punter Mark Bounds of Texas Tech. Desmond Howard also won the 1991 Heisman Trophy.

Consensus All-Americans
The following charts identify the NCAA-recognized consensus All-Americans for the year 1991 and display which first-team designations they received.

Full selections - offense

Quarterback
 Ty Detmer, Brigham Young (CFHOF) (AFCA, AP-1, FWAA, UPI-1, NEA)
 Casey Weldon, Florida State (AP-2, WCFF, FN, SH])
 Shane Matthews, Florida (AP-3, UPI-2)

Running backs
 Vaughn Dunbar, Indiana (AFCA, AP-1, FWAA, UPI-1, WCFF, FN, NEA, SH)
 Trevor Cobb, Rice (AFCA, AP-2, UPI-1, FN)
 Russell White, California (AP-2, FWAA, UPI-2, WCFF, NEA)
 Marshall Faulk, San Diego St. (AP-1, SH)
 Amp Lee, Florida State (WCFF)
 Tony Sands, Kansas (AP-3, UPI-2)
 Derek Brown, Nebraska (AP-3)

Wide receivers
 Desmond Howard, Michigan  (CFHOF) (AFCA, AP-1, FWAA, UPI-1, WCFF, FN, NEA, SH, TSN)
 Mario Bailey, Washington (AP-1, FWAA, UPI-1, NEA)
 Carl Pickens, Tennessee (AFCA, AP-2, UPI-2, FN, SH, TSN)
 Sean LaChapelle, UCLA (AP-2, UPI-2)
 Aaron Turner, Pacific (AP-3)
 Michael Smith, Kansas State (AP-3)

Tight end
 Kelly Blackwell, TCU (AFCA, AP-1, UPI-1, FN, SH, TSN)
 Derek Brown, Notre Dame (WCFF, NEA)
 Mark Chmura, Boston College (AP-2, FWAA, UPI-2)
 Johnny Mitchell, Nebraska (AP-3)

Tackles
 Greg Skrepenak, Michigan (AFCA, AP-1, FWAA, UPI-1, WCFF, FN, NEA, SH, TSN)
 Bob Whitfield, Stanford (AP-1, UPI-1, FN, NEA, SH, TSN)
 Leon Searcy, Miami (Fla.) (AP-2, FWAA, UPI-2, SH)
 Ray Roberts, Virginia (AFCA, AP-2, UPI-2, SH)
 Troy Auzenne, California (AFCA, AP-3)
 Eugene Chung, Virginia Tech (FWAA)
 Lincoln Kennedy, Washington (AP-3)

Guards
 Jeb Flesch, Clemson (AP-1, UPI-1, WCFF, FN, NEA)
 Mirko Jurkovic, Notre Dame (AP-2, UPI-1, WCFF, FN, NEA, TSN)
 Jerry Ostroski, Tulsa (AP-1, FWAA, UPI-2, TSN)
 Tim Simpson, Illinois (AFCA, AP-3, UPI-2)
 Will Shields, Nebraska (AP-2)
 Hesham Ismail, Florida (AP-3)

Center
 Jay Leeuwenburg, Colorado (AFCA, AP-1, FWAA, UPI-1, WCFF, FN, NEA, SH, TSN)
 Cal Dixon, Florida (AP-2)
 Mike Devlin, Iowa (AP-3, UPI-2)

Full selections - defense

Linemen
 Steve Emtman, Washington (CFHOF) (AFCA, AP-1, FWAA, UPI-1, WCFF, FN, NEA, SH, TSN)
 Santana Dotson, Baylor (AFCA, AP-1, FWAA, UPI-1, WCFF, FN, SH, TSN)
 Brad Culpepper, Florida (AFCA, AP-1, UPI-2, FN, NEA, SH, TSN)
 Leroy Smith, Iowa  (AFCA, AP-1)
 Robert Stewart, Alabama (AP-2, UPI-1, NEA, TSN)
 Rob Bodine, Clemson (AP-2, FWAA)
 Joel Steed, Colorado (AP-3, UPI-2, WCFF)
 Shane Dronett, Texas (AP-3, UPI-2, WCFF)
 James Patton, Texas (AP-2)
 Rusty Medearis, Miami (AP-2, UPI-2)
 Robin Jones, Baylor (AP-3)
 Chris Slade, Virginia (AP-3)

Linebackers
 Robert Jones, East Carolina (AFCA, AP-1, FWAA, UPI-1, WCFF, FN, NEA, SH, TSN)
 Marvin Jones, Florida State (AP-1, FWAA, UPI-1, WCFF, NEA,  SH, TSN)
 Levon Kirkland, Clemson (AFCA, UPI-2, WCFF, SH, TSN)
 Marco Coleman, Georgia Tech  (AP-2, FWAA, UPI-2, NEA, SH)
 Darrin Smith, Miami (Fla.) (AP-2, UPI-1, FN)
 Joe Bowden, Oklahoma (AP-1, UPI-2, FN)
 Steve Tovar, Ohio State (AFCA, AP-3)
 Dave Hoffmann, Washington (AP-2, FWAA)
 Erick Anderson, Michigan (AP-3, UPI-1)
 Quentin Coryatt, Texas A&M (NEA)
 Demetrius DuBose, Notre Dame (FN)
 Ed McDaniel, Clemson (AP-3)

Defensive backs
 Terrell Buckley, Florida State (AFCA, AP-1, FWAA, UPI-1, WCFF, FN, NEA, SH, TSN)
 Dale Carter, Tennessee (AP-1, FWAA, UPI-1, WCFF, FN, NEA, SH, TSN)
 Darryl Williams, Miami (Fla.) (AFCA, AP-1, WCFF, SH)
 Kevin Smith, Texas A&M (AFCA, AP-1, UPI-2, WCFF, FN, SH, TSN)
 Troy Vincent, Wisconsin (AP-2, FWAA, UPI-1, FN, NEA, TSN)
 Matt Darby, UCLA (AFCA, AP-2, UPI-1)
 Darren Perry, Penn State (AP-2, FWAA, UPI-2, NEA)
 Willie Clay, Georgia Tech (AP-2, UPI-2)
 Eric Castle, Oregon (AP-3)
 Sean Lumpkin, Minnesota (AP-3)
 Carlton Gray, UCLA (AP-3)
 Tracy Saul, Texas Tech (AP-3, UPI-2)

Full selections - special teams

Placekicker
 Carlos Huerta, Miami  (Fla.) (AFCA, AP-1, NEA, UPI-2, WCFF, SH, TSN, FN)
 Jason Hanson, Washington State (UPI-1, FWAA)
 Dan Eichioff, Kansas (AP-2)
 Jason Elam, Hawaii (AP-3)

Punter
 Mark Bounds, Texas Tech (AFCA, AP-1, FWAA, UPI-1, WCFF, FN, NEA, SH, TSN)
 Jason Christ, Air Force (AP-2, UPI-2)
 Pete Raether, Arkansas (AP-3)

All-purpose / kick returners 
 Kevin Williams, Miami (Fla.) (FWAA [punt returner], TSN)
 Qadry Ismail, Syracuse (AP-3 [all purpose], FWAA [kickoff returner])
 Ryan Benjamin, Pacific (AP-1 [return specialist])
 Dion Johnson, East Carolina (AP-2 [all purpose])

Key

 Bold – Used for (1) consensus All-American and (2) first-team selections by an official selector
 CFHOF - Inducted into the College Football Hall of Fame
 -1 – First-team selection
 -2 – Second-team selection
 -3 – Third-team selection

Official selectors
 AFCA = American Football Coaches Association for Kodak
 AP = Associated Press
 FWAA = Football Writers Association of America
 UPI = United Press International
 WC = Walter Camp Football Foundation chosen by coaches and sports information directors at 105 Division I-A schools

Other selectors
 FN = Football News
 NEA = Newspaper Enterprise Association
 SH = Scripps Howard News Service
 TSN = The Sporting News

See also
 1991 All-Big Eight Conference football team
 1991 All-Big Ten Conference football team
 1991 All-Pacific-10 Conference football team
 1991 All-SEC football team

References

All-America Team
College Football All-America Teams